Komtar JBCC is a shopping mall in Johor Bahru, Johor, Malaysia.

History
The shopping mall was established as a redevelopment project of the old KOMTAR building complex. The old building was transformed into the shopping mall, hotel and office with a cost of MYR400 million. The soft opening of the shopping mall was held on 2 August 2014 and was fully completed in November the same year.

Architecture
The shopping mall is housed in a 4-story building. It has a total floor area of 57,913 m2.

Transportation
The shopping mall is accessible within walking distance from Johor Bahru Sentral Station.

References

External links

 
 

2014 establishments in Malaysia
Shopping malls in Johor Bahru